Akar Ali Salih Salih (born 1990) is an Iraqi chess player. He was awarded the title of FIDE Master in 2011.

Chess career
He has represented Iraq in a number of Chess Olympiads, including 2012 (4/9 on board four), 2014 (3½/11 on board one) and 2016 (4/9 on board three).

He qualified for the Chess World Cup 2021, where he was defeated 2-0 by Alexander Onischuk in the first round.

References

External links

Akar Ali Salih Salih chess games at 365Chess.com

1990 births
Living people
Iraqi chess players
Chess Olympiad competitors
Chess FIDE Masters